Bojanala Platinum is one of the 4 districts of North West province of South Africa. The seat of Bojanala Platinum is Rustenburg. The majority of its 1,507,505 people speak Setswana (2011 Census). The district code is DC37.

Geography

Neighbours 
Bojanala Platinum is surrounded by:
 Waterberg (DC36) to the north
 Tshwane (Pretoria) to the east
 West Rand (CBDC8) to the south-east
 Dr Kenneth Kaunda (DC40) to the south
 Ngaka Modiri Molema (DC38) to the west

Local municipalities 
The district contains the following local municipalities:

Demographics
The following statistics are from the 2011 census.

Gender

Ethnic group

Age

Politics

Election results 
Election results for Bojanala Platinum in the South African general election, 2004. 
 Population 18 and over: 772,262 [65.15% of total population] 
 Total votes: 445,856 [37.61% of total population] 
 Voting % estimate: 57.73% votes as a % of population 18 and over

References

External links
 Bojanala Platinum DM Official Website

District Municipalities of North West (South African province)
Bojanala Platinum District Municipality